The Ohio–Serbia National Guard Partnership is one of 25 European partnerships that make-up the U.S. European Command State Partnership Program and one of 88 worldwide partnerships that make-up the National Guard State Partnership Program. The country of Serbia signed a bilateral affairs agreement with the U.S. Department of Defense and the state of Ohio in 2006 establishing the Ohio-Serbian State Partnership program. With a substantial Serbian-American community in Cleveland (as well as other Ohio cities) it was a natural fit to create this partnership.  Since then, Ohio and Serbia have conducted over 70 SPP events in a host of security cooperation activities ranging from bilateral familiarizations, small unit exchanges, exercises, senior military and civic leader visits to the potential development of future Medical Readiness Training Exercise (MEDRETE).

The state partners actively participate in a host of security cooperation activities ranging from bilateral familiarization and training-like events, to exercises, fellowship-style internships and civic leader visits. All activities are coordinated through the Theater Combatant Commanders, the US Ambassadors' country teams and other agencies as appropriate, to ensure that National Guard support is tailored to meet both U.S. and country objectives.

History
"While the State Partnership usually starts as cooperation in the military sector, it can quickly grow into a civilian relationship.  Our main contribution in this effort is out experience as Citizen-Soldiers and Airmen.  However I believe the partnership is a mutual cooperation and we will learn from each others' experiences.  We can show the value of the reserve force whose members are full-time civilians and part-time service members and the unique contributions those members bring to the table." - MG Greg Wayt, former Adjutant General, Ohio National Guard

Overview:
 State Partnership was established in 2006
 New Prime Minister- Ivica Dacic
 New Defense Minister- Aleksandar Vucic
 Presidential run-offs were held and Tomislav Nikolic won in a surprising victory.
 New MOD Secretaries of Defense and Assistant Ministers appointed
 Serbia will not participate in M2M events where Kosovo is recognized
 Serbia's 2012 economic decline was the steepest in region; World Bank estimates 2% growth for 2013

The Ohio and Serbia partnership was formally established in September 2006 with the signing of the Status of Forces Agreement between the United States and Serbia.  An initial planning meeting was held that same month when the Ohio Adjutant General traveled to Serbia and met with Serbian Armed Forces Chief of General Staff.  This provided a unique partnership, capacity-building capability to the combatant commanders and the U.S. Ambassador to Serbia.  In doing so Ohio supports the United States national interests and security cooperation goals by engaging with Serbia via military, socio-political and economic conduits at the local, state and national levels.  The original goal SPP goal was to execute the first event by the end of 2006.  The partnership was able to execute three events including an event in Belgrade and two familiarizations visits to Ohio.  Since then, SPP events conducted with Ohio and Serbia has multiplied to 30 proposed events for fiscal year 2014!  As this relationship has progressed from basic familiarizations; multiple Humanitarian Assistance projects; medical forces exchange and participation in the Serbian Air Show in 2012, Ohio looks forward to continuing to work with the Serbian Armed Forces.  On the horizon, the Ohio and Serbian relationship will be instrumental in the continual development of Serbia's Peace Keeping Operations (PKO).  With the construction of a training center (South Base); sharing in exercise preparations; NCO development and air field support of PKO missions, Ohio and Serbia can be a model of how close coordination and cooperation between the United States and Serbia can promote mutually beneficial events.  These events not only strengthen active theater security but also promote greater regional stability.

Events in 2012 included:
 TAG Visit
 Peace Keeping Operations Base Development and Assistance (South Base)
 Humanitarian Assistance Project (Reconstruction of an elementary school)
 NCO Development
 Women in professional Armed Forces
 Consequence Management
 Medical Support to Deployed Forces
 Participation of the Serbian Air Show

Partnership focus
Ohio and Serbia intend to continue the 7-year relationship that allows open dialogue that transcends geopolitics while continuing to assist Serbia's interoperability and willingness to partner in peace keeping operations.

The following are EUCOM stated areas of focus for Ohio-Serbia partnership:
 Build partnerships to enhance security and prevent the evolution of local crisis into regional conflicts
 Prevent violent extremist organizations to create transnational threats
 Continue Peace Keeping Operations Base Development and Assistance (South Base)
 Maintain  Unit Level Exchanges

The following are FY2013 areas of focus:
 TAG Visit
 Peace Keeping Operations Base Development and Assistance (South Base)
 Consequence Management
 Cyber Defense – Staff Assistance Visit (SAV)
 Helicopter Unit Operations
 Introduction to US ROTC
 Women in professional Armed Forces
 Chaplaincy Development

References

External links
The EUCOM State Partnership page for Ohio-Serbia
Department of Defense News on the Ohio-Serbia Partnership
EUCOM SPP
National Guard Bureau SPP
National Guard Bureau SPP News Archives

Military alliances involving the United States
Ohio National Guard
Serbia–United States military relations